The 1954 World Table Tennis Championships mixed doubles was the 21st edition of the mixed doubles championship.  

Ivan Andreadis and Gizi Farkas defeated Yoshio Tomita and Fujie Eguchi in the final by three sets to one.

Results

See also
 List of World Table Tennis Championships medalists

References

-